The 2012 Clásica de Almería was the 27th edition of the Clásica de Almería cycle race and was held on 26 February 2012. The race started and finished in Almería. The race was won by Michael Matthews.

General classification

References

2012
2012 in road cycling
2012 in Spanish sport